SOPAC has the following meanings:
The Southern Pacific Railroad (SoPac)
The South Pacific Applied Geoscience Commission
Social OnLine Public Access Catalog
South Orange Performing Arts Center
Sydney Olympic Park Aquatic Centre
South Pacific Combat Air Transport Command
South Pacific Area